The Archaeological Museum of Polygyros is a museum in Polygyros, Chalkidiki, in Greece. The museum is located in Iroou Square in the town centre and displays representative archaeological finds from all over Chalkidiki. More specifically, they cover a span of time ranging from the Bronze Age to the Roman period and come from ancient Stageira (near Olympias), Toroni, Pyrgadikia, Aphytos, Polygyros, Ierissos, Stratoni, as also from the ancient city of Olynthos.
Museum is currently closed for complete reconstruction. The Archaeological Museum of Polygyros was closed in January 2012 and reconstruction began in May 2012. Completion of reconstruction is expected sometime in summer 2014.

The most important exhibits are an unfinished kouros of the Archaic period, weapons and jewellery of the Late Archaic and Classical periods, a marble head of Dionysos from ancient Aphytos (4th century BC), a black-figure column crater from Vrasta (late 6th century BC), and two marble grave statues from the heroön at Stratoni (1st century BC). Particularly important are the finds from the city and the cemetery of Olynthos, of the Archaic and Classical period, because they give a full picture of the everyday activities and the public life of that time.

The museum has hosted an exhibition entitled 'Three Colonies of Andros in Chalcidice: Sane, Akanthos, Stageira since 1998. Among many other things, it includes three standing or kneeling statues of Nike from the roof of a temple of the 6th century BC, which was originally at Sane and was later incorporated into the urban complex of Ouranoupolis.

Thanks to the exhibition, the Polygyros Museum won the 16th Directorate of Prehistoric and Classical Antiquities' Museum of the Year Award in 1998.

Gallery

Attribution

External links

Hellenic Ministry of Culture and Tourism - in Greek only
www.planetware.com

Polygyros
Chalkidiki